Hamadou Karamoko (born 31 October 1995) is a French professional footballer who plays as a centre-back for Luxembourgish club Progrès Niederkorn.

Career
Karamoko is a youth exponent from Lorient. He signed his first professional contract with the club in May 2015. He made his Ligue 1 debut on 26 January 2016 against Rennes playing the full match .

Following release from Lorient at the end of the 2015–16 season, Karamoko signed an 18 month contract with Nantes in January 2017.

After six months without a club, in February 2019, Karamoko joined Lusitanos Saint-Maur, of the fourth-tier Championnat National 2.

On 18 June 2019, Karamoko signed a two-year contract with Red Star.

On 16 July 2022, Karamoko joined Paris 13 Atletico.

Personal life
Born in France, Karamoko is of Ivorian descent.

References

1995 births
Living people
Footballers from Paris
French footballers
French sportspeople of Ivorian descent
Association football central defenders
Ligue 1 players
Championnat National players
Championnat National 2 players
Championnat National 3 players
FC Lorient players
FC Nantes players
US Lusitanos Saint-Maur players
Red Star F.C. players
FC Chambly Oise players
Paris 13 Atletico players
FC Progrès Niederkorn players
French expatriate footballers
Expatriate footballers in Luxembourg
French expatriate sportspeople in Luxembourg